Bicom Systems is a producer and vendor of Asterisk (PBX)-based unified communications devices for VoIP businesses. Bicom Systems uses open standards telephony. Products include all of the software and hardware components involved in building a VoIP business or ITSP.

History
Bicom Systems began researching and creating telecoms management software in 2003. An Asterisk pioneer, Bicom Systems launched the first ever open standards turnkey telephony system in 2004.

Bicom Systems has seven products including a desktop and mobile softphone, an IP PBX telephony platform, and an IP Key Systems product. Supported hardware manufacturers include Polycom, Yealink, and others.

See also
 Comparison of VoIP software
 List of SIP software
 IP PBX

References

Unified communications
Teleconferencing
Videotelephony
Telephone service enhanced features
business software
VoIP software
C (programming language) software
communication software
Telephone exchange equipment
Lua (programming language)-scriptable software
Asterisk (PBX)